Rolling paper is a specialty paper used for making cigarettes (commercially manufactured filter cigarettes and individually made roll-your-own cigarettes). Rolling papers are packs of several cigarette-size sheets, often folded inside a cardboard wrapper. They are also known as 'blanks', which are used to encase tobacco or cannabis. It may be flavoured.

Rolling papers are also used for rolling cannabis cigarettes called Joints.

History

The first cigarette paper was produced in Alcoy, Spain, in 1764. Paper cigarettes became popular in the second half of the 19th century, displacing the more expensive cigars and cigarillos.

As cigars and cigarillos were expensive, the beggars of Spain would collect the cigar butts from the ground and roll them in pieces of paper to be smoked. During the Crimean War this culture became more prevalent and British soldiers learned how to roll tobacco in newspapers. Frequent use of rolling paper became a custom, and to fulfil the need, rolling paper companies Pay-Pay, Smoking, and Rizla emerged.

Composition

Cigarette paper is made from thin and lightweight "rag fibers" (nonwood plant fibers) such as flax, hemp, sisal, rice straw, and esparto. The paper is available in rolls and rectangular sheets of varying sizes, and has a narrow strip of glue along one long edge. It may be transparent, colored and flavored. It has a high filler content and a basis weight of 10-28 g/m2. To control the smoking properties, this paper has a porosity that is suited to the type of tobacco and contains additives that regulate burning. One critical paper characteristic is permeability; its primary physical influence is smoke dilution. Among the fillers used are calcium carbonate to influence the permeability and color, magnesium carbonate to improve ash color, or titanium oxide if a particularly white ash is required. Sodium potassium tartrate (Seignette's salt), sodium and potassium citrate are used as a combustion regulator in cigarette paper, increased levels result in faster burning papers. Poly(vinyl alcohol) in aqueous solution is used for cigarette adhesives.

Permeability is defined as the measure of the volume of air that flows through a specified area of cigarette paper in a given unit of time. It is measured in CORESTA units. US commercial filter cigarette brands have paper permeability between 14 and 51 CORESTA units. Increased cigarette paper permeability results in increased smoke dilution with air.

Fire-resistant cigarettes, which reduce the risk of fire from unattended cigarettes, are made with special paper that includes a plastic compound, ethylene vinyl acetate. If a cigarette made with this type of paper is left unattended, the plastic in the paper will help the cigarette self-extinguish.

Other specialty papers for tobacco products are:
 Imitation cork paper is a brownish yellow colored paper used for the production of cigarette tips. It has an imitation cork imprint and joins the filter to the tobacco stick.
 Filter encasing paper is used for the production of acetate or cellulose filters. The tip paper may be covered with polyvinyl alcohol.
 Cigar or cigarillo casing paper holds the chopped tobacco together and serves as the inner casing.

Consumption

United States

In 2008, Tobacconist Magazine called roll-your-own (RYO) the tobacco industry's fastest growing segment. It estimates that 2–4% of cigarette smokers in the United States, or approximately 2.6 million people, make their own cigarettes. Many of these smokers have switched in response to increasingly high taxes on manufactured cigarettes.

Canada
In 2000, a Canadian government survey estimated that 9% of Canada's 6,000,000 cigarette smokers smoked hand-rolled cigarettes "sometimes or most of the time", 7% smoked roll-your-owns "exclusively", and over 90% of rolling papers sold in Canada were for tobacco consumption. A more recent 2009 study has shown that approximately 925,000 Canadians roll their own cigarettes.

United Kingdom
According to The Publican, "Low price RYO has seen an astonishing rise of 175% in [2007] as cigarette smokers look for cheaper alternatives and to control the size of their smoke". The National Health Service has reported that roll-your-own use has more than doubled since 1990, from 11% to 24%. Many of these smokers apparently believe that hand-rolled cigarettes are less harmful than manufactured products, although it is equally possible that the increase is due to the steep rise in prices since the early-1990s to the present day.

Thailand
In Thailand, roll-your-own smokers have long exceeded those for manufactured brands; Often, cheaper papers without gum are kept constantly between the fingers while smoking

New Zealand
The New Zealand Ministry of Health reported in 2005 that: 'The ratio of roll-your-own to manufactured or tailor-made cigarettes consumed by New Zealanders has risen over (at least) the past decade, perhaps reflecting price differences between these products, and currently approaching 50 percent overall.'

India
As the prices of cigarettes rise year after year, roll-your-own is becoming a trend among Indian smokers. Rolling papers and rolling tobacco are now easily accessible and can be bought at almost any Pan Shops in India.

Taxation
Consumers' switching to roll-your-own has led to a response among certain tax authorities. In the United States, Indiana and Kentucky tax rolling papers. Kentucky set its tax at $0.25 per pack (for up to 32 leaves, larger packs are taxed at $0.0078 per leaf) in 2006 despite complaints from manufacturers. Louisiana Revised Statute 47:338.261 allows up to $1.25 per pack at retail.

Regulation

United States
The FDA stated in 2011 that every brand (including private labels) of cigarette rolling papers sold in the US must submit their ingredients and seek agency approval or withdraw from the marketplace by March of that year if they had not been sold in the US before February 15, 2007.

See also
 List of rolling papers

References

External links

 
Paper products
Cannabis smoking
Drug paraphernalia